Events from the year 1832 in France.

Incumbents
 Monarch – Louis Philippe I

Events
5 June - Anti-monarchist June Rebellion briefly breaks out in Paris.
4–23 December - Siege of Antwerp: the last remaining Dutch defensive point, the citadel, falls to French attack.

Arts and literature
26 February - Chopin gives his debut Paris concert at the Salle Pleyel. 
September - The Opéra-Comique moves from Salle Ventadour to Salle de la Bourse in Paris.
Théâtre des Folies-Dramatiques opens on the site of the Théâtre de l'Ambigu-Comique on the Boulevard du Temple in Paris under Frédérick Lemaître.
Honoré de Balzac publishes the novels La Bourse, Le Curé de Tours, Le Colonel Chabert and Louis Lambert.

Births
6 January - Gustave Doré, artist, engraver, illustrator and sculptor (died 1883)
23 January - Édouard Manet, painter (died 1883)
16 February - Camille Armand Jules Marie, Prince de Polignac, nobleman, scholar and major general in the Confederate States Army (died 1913)
12 March 
 Jean Alfred Fournier, dermatologist (died 1914)
 Charles Friedel, chemist and mineralogist (died 1889) 
26 March - Michel Bréal, philologist (died 1915)
25 May - Marie-Louise Gagneur, née Mignerot, feminist (died 1902)
6 July - Alexis André, missionary priest in Canada (died 1893)
29 September - Léon Labbé, surgeon and politician (died 1916)
15 December - Gustave Eiffel, structural engineer and architect, designer of the Eiffel Tower (died 1923)
Full date unknown - Félicien Henry Caignart de Saulcy, entomologist (died 1912).

Deaths

January to June
4 March - Jean-François Champollion, classical scholar, philologist and orientalist (born 1790).
13 April - Jean-Baptiste Jacques Augustin, painter (born 1759).
23 April - François-Nicolas Delaistre, sculptor (born 1746).
7 May - Charles Guillaume Alexandre Bourgeois, physicist and painter (born 1759).
13 May - Georges Cuvier, naturalist and zoologist (born 1769).
16 May - Casimir Pierre Périer, statesman (born 1777).
26 May - François-Louis Perne, composer and musicographer (born 1772).
31 May - Évariste Galois, mathematician (born 1811).
1 June - Jean Maximilien Lamarque, statesman (born 1770).
4 June - Jean-Pierre Abel-Rémusat, sinologist (born 1788).
5 June - 166 deaths at the barricades in the June Rebellion

July to December
22 July - Napoleon II of France, son of Napoleon Bonaparte (born 1811).
23 July - Louis-François Jeannet, general (born 1768).
17 August - Pierre Yrieix Daumesnil, soldier (born 1776).
24 August - Nicolas Léonard Sadi Carnot, physicist and military engineer (born 1796).
9 September - Charles Mathieu Isidore Decaen, general (born 1769).
15 November - Jean-Baptiste Say, economist and businessman (born 1767).

See also

References

1830s in France